Claudia M. Palena is an Argentine immunologist and cancer researcher. She is head of the immunoregulation section at the National Cancer Institute. Palena researches tumor immunology and cancer immunotherapy.

Life 
Palena received a B.S. and Ph.D. degree in biochemistry from the National University of Rosario. She came to the National Cancer Institute (NCI) in 2000 as a postdoctoral researcher in the laboratory of tumor immunology and biology.

Palena became a staff scientist in 2008. In 2011, she was promoted to tenure-track investigator in 2011. Palena became a tenured senior investigator in 2017. She heads the immunoregulation section in the NCI laboratory of tumor immunology and biology. Palena is active in the area of tumor immunology and cancer immunotherapy.

Research 
Palena's current research is focused on the development of immunotherapeutic approaches aimed at targeting critical events in tumor progression with the ultimate goal of designing vaccine platforms and combinatorial therapies for the prevention and/or treatment of metastases in human cancer.

The main goal of her research is to address the two central features of metastatic disease: tumor dissemination and resistance to therapy. Her group is investigating how changes in the phenotype of a tumor between the epithelial and a mesenchymal-like state (a phenomenon called carcinoma mesenchymalization) could facilitate the dissemination of the tumor cells and make them resistant to anticancer therapies. Palena's laboratory has identified the T-box transcription factor brachyury—a molecule normally expressed in the embryo but absent in normal adult tissues—as a novel tumor antigen, a driver of mesenchymalization and drug resistance in human carcinoma cells, and a target for T-cell-mediated immunotherapy. Her studies have shown that brachyury is overexpressed in various human carcinomas, both in the primary tumor and in metastatic sites, and that high brachyury expression in the primary tumor site is associated with poor clinical outcome. The results of these investigations led to a team science effort—including her laboratory, scientists and clinicians from the intramural and extramural scientific communities, and collaborators in the private sector—that resulted in the translation of two brachyury-based cancer vaccines from preclinical stage into phase 1 and phase 2 clinical trials in patients with advanced carcinomas and the rare tumor chordoma.

Palena's laboratory investigates the various signals that induce changes in tumor phenotype. They have demonstrated that brachyury overexpression induces the secretion of interleukin-8 (IL-8) and the expression of IL-8 receptors, and that IL-8 signaling is critical for maintaining the mesenchymal characteristics of human tumor cells.

References

External links 
 

Living people
Place of birth missing (living people)
Date of birth missing (living people)
21st-century Argentine women scientists
Argentine biologists
Argentine expatriates in the United States
Argentine medical researchers
Cancer researchers
Hispanic and Latino American scientists
National Institutes of Health people
National University of Rosario alumni
Women immunologists
Women medical researchers
Year of birth missing (living people)